Yang Hanyu (born October 12, 1999 in Shandong) is a Chinese volleyball player. Her former full name is Yang Liu. She participated at the 2018 Montreux Volley Masters, 2018 FIVB Volleyball Women's Nations League, and 2018 FIVB Volleyball Women's World Championship.

She was the best blocker of 2018 FIVB Volleyball Women's Club World Championship in fact as the member of Zhejiang Xitang.

Awards

National team

Junior Team
 2016 Asian Junior Women's Volleyball Championship -  Gold Medal
 2017 FIVB Volleyball Women's U20 World Championship -  Gold Medal

Senior Team
 2018 World Championship -  Bronze Medal

Clubs
 2017 National Games of China -  Bronze medal, with Shandong Junior

Individuals
 2016 Asian Junior Women's Volleyball Championship "Best Middle Blocker"
 2017 FIVB Volleyball Women's U20 World Championship "Best Middle Blocker"
 ''2017 FIVB Volleyball Women's U20 World Championship "Most Valuable Player"'

References

1999 births
Living people
Volleyball players from Shandong
Chinese women's volleyball players
Middle blockers
21st-century Chinese women